Dypterygia caliginosa is a moth of the family Noctuidae. It is found in the Russian Far East, the Korean Peninsula and Japan.

The wingspan ranges from 38–45 mm.

References

External links
Korean Nature
Japanese Moths

Hadeninae
Moths of Japan
Moths described in 1858